Mazzuoli may refer to:

 Mazzuoli (family), an Italian family of artists from Umbria and Tuscany
 Mazzuoli (surname), Italian surname

See also 

 Mazzoli